Ian Cunningham Crawford (born 13 September 1954) is a former English cricketer.  Crawford was a right-handed batsman who bowled right-arm off break.  He was born in Bristol.

Crawford made his first-class debut for Gloucestershire against Glamorgan in the 1975 County Championship.  He made 4 further first-class appearances, the last of which came against the touring New Zealanders in 1978.  In his 5 first-class matches, he scored 104 runs at an average of 14.85, with a high score of 73.  This score came against Oxford University in 1978.  With the ball, he took 3 wickets at a bowling average of 58.00, with best figures of 1/18.  He made his List A debut in the 1978 John Player League against Derbyshire.  He made a further List A appearance against the same opposition later that season in the Benson & Hedges Cup.  He batted once in this format and was dismissed for a duck in this only innings.

References

External links

1954 births
Living people
Cricketers from Bristol
English cricketers
Gloucestershire cricketers